RFA Eddybay (A107) was an Eddy-class coastal tanker of the Royal Fleet Auxiliary. As with others of the class the ship had a short career and was stationed at Gibraltar for much of that time as a petrol carrier, spending three years at the colony in total.

References
 Eddy-Class Coastal Tankers
 Historical RFA

 

Eddy-class coastal tankers
1951 ships
Ships built in Dundee